Live at Stubb's may refer to:

Live at Stubb's (Blue October album)
Live at Stubb's (Matisyahu album)
Live at Stubb's (Ween album)